Interislander is a road and rail ferry service across New Zealand's Cook Strait, between Wellington in the North Island and Picton in the South Island. It is owned and operated by state-owned rail operator KiwiRail. Three roll-on roll-off (RORO) vessels operate the  route, taking about three hours to complete the crossing.

The inter-island rail ferry service began in August 1962 by the New Zealand Railways Department (NZR). The service primarily provided a RORO rail link between its North and South Island networks, allowing NZR to compete directly with coastal shipping companies for inter-island freight. It also provided the first RORO road link between the two islands, which saw the Wellington to Picton ferries compete with, and then completely replace, the Union Company's Wellington–Lyttelton ferry service. Today, the Interislander service is still well patronised despite competition on the Wellington–Picton sea route with Bluebridge and from airlines, carrying around one million passengers and 230,000 vehicles per year on 5,500 sailings.

In 2017, Interislander became part of The Great Journeys of New Zealand, a new tourism brand created by KiwiRail to unite its four scenic passenger services: Interislander, Northern Explorer, Coastal Pacific and the TranzAlpine.

History

Introduction
Before 1962, the North Island and South Island rail networks were not connected, and the New Zealand Railways Department (NZR) struggled to compete with ships for inter-island transport. In the days before containerisation, rail freight between the islands had to be railed in a wagon to Wellington, unloaded and transferred onto a ship to Picton or Lyttelton, then loaded into another wagon before being railed the rest of the way. The Union Steam Ship Company (USSC) ran an overnight ferry between Lyttelton and Wellington using steamers. NZR also contracted SAFE Air to run its Rail Air airfreight service for freight between the islands, from Paraparaumu to Blenheim, but this was limited to aircraft payloads.

The decision to start a rail ferry was made in 1958 by the Cook Strait Transport Enquiry Committee. The enquiry was set up following Union Steam Ship's decision to withdraw the unprofitable Tamahine, built in 1925. NZR was officially reluctant to compete with USSC for inter-island traffic, but supplied the New Zealand Railway Officers' Institute with information to put to the enquiry.

The Cook Strait Inter-Island Rail and Road Service (as it was known) started on 11 August 1962 with the roll-on roll-off ferry . The service dramatically increased efficiency, since freight could stay in the same wagon the whole journey, reducing time and money. Aramoana took just 3 hours 20 minutes to cross Cook Strait, dramatically decreasing the time between the two islands for cars and passengers - Wellington to Christchurch travel time was reduced from 11 hours on the USSC ferry to nine hours by NZR ferry and road. The initial service was one sailing each way per day, Wellington to Picton in the morning and Picton to Wellington in the afternoon. The new service led to the decline of NZR's Rail Air service, which saw a dramatic drop in airfreight.

The service was an immediate success, although it was criticised for high prices. At NZ£ 9 10s one way for a family of four and a car up to 4.04 m (equal to NZ$395 in 2016 dollars,) many people thought the service was overpriced for a state-operated service. Nevertheless, it was a cash cow for NZR - in the 1963-64 financial year, it contributed £535,000 of the NZR's £538,500 working profit.

The Union Company responded to the competition by converting  to take roll-on roll-off (RORO) road traffic and ordering a new RORO ship, . However, the resurgence was short-lived: on 10 April 1968, Wahine foundered at the entrance to Wellington Harbour during a storm, resulting in 53 deaths. By the time replacement ship  entered service in 1972, competition from the Cook Strait ferries and increased competition from air travel, especially following the National Airways Corporation's introduction of the Boeing 737 in 1968, saw the Wellington-Lyttelton service become uneconomic. The Union Company withdrew in 1974, and after two years under the Ministry of Transport, the service was cancelled in September 1976. In 1982 Arahura joined the fleet to replace the ageing Aramoana and Aranui. The faster Arahura reduced the time across Cook Strait by 20 minutes to three hours.

Initially, USSC operated the ferries on NZR's behalf. This changed in 1970 when the Minister of Railways, Peter Gordon, announced that NZR would be forming its own maritime service to operate the inter-island ferries.

SeaRail and The Interislander
When the New Zealand Railways Corporation (the successor to the Railways Department) was restructured in 1982, the service was renamed "SeaRail". In 1989, it was renamed the Interisland Line, and the service became known as The Interislander. The fleet was upgraded with improved facilities and an updated livery whose logo incorporated Pelorus Jack. In 1991, New Zealand Rail Ltd, including the Interisland Line, was spun off from the Railways Corporation. In 1993, New Zealand Rail Ltd was privatised and became Tranz Rail in 1995. In 1999, Tranz Rail leased , and between 1999 and 2001 disposed of Arahanga and the Aratika.

In 2004, Toll NZ bought out Tranz Rail, and the Interisland Line was renamed the Interislander. Both ships were repainted in a new livery, with a fern replacing Pelorus Jack on the funnel - he moved to the hull with the logo. In 2005, Toll leased Challenger, which in 2007 was renamed . Kaitaki was the first Interislander ferry without a rail deck, and the first with a bow door (all the other ferries were stern boarding).

KiwiRail
On 1 July 2008, the New Zealand Government purchased Toll NZ, including Interislander, becoming part of KiwiRail.

In 2011, Aratere was lengthened by adding a 30-metre midsection to increase its capacity.

In November 2012, Interislander staff threatened strike action over the upcoming Christmas period, demanding better wages. Owner KiwiRail responded with a lock-out notice. Freight company Mainfreight slammed the union's actions as "bloody disruptive".

In November 2013, Aratere snapped a drive shaft and lost a propeller in the Cook Strait. Interislander chartered  to help with the peak summer period while Aratere was under repair. In December 2014, it was announced Stena Alegra would be chartered long-term to replace the ageing Arahura. Arahura last sailed on 29 July 2015, and the Stena Alegra, refurbished and renamed Kaiarahi, entered service in September 2015.

All vessels were scheduled to be replaced by two identical rail capable vessels by 2024. Then it was planned that the much larger rail equipped ferries would be introduced in 2024 and 2025. A NZ$551m contract for the ferries was awarded to Hyundai Mipo Dockyard in 2021, with deliveries in 2025 and 2026. The new ferries will triple rail capacity, with space for 40 wagons on each ship.

The Lynx
The Lynx was the Interislander's fast ferry service across Cook Strait. The "Vomit Comet", as it was sometimes dubbed, was an initial success, taking half the time of the regular Interislander ferries.

In 1994, speed restrictions were imposed in Wellington harbour to reduce wash and protect ships berthed at Aotea Quay, and in May 2000 an  speed limit was imposed on all ships in the Marlborough Sounds after residents complained of shoreline damage caused by the ferries. By 2002, The Lynx took 2 hours 15 minutes to complete its journey.

Fleet

Current fleet

Historic fleet

References

Bibliography

External links
 Interislander (official site)
 Cook Strait rail ferries – New Zealand History, by Ministry for Culture and Heritage

Rail transport in New Zealand
Picton, New Zealand
Cook Strait Ferry
1962 establishments in New Zealand